The Serbian Autonomous Oblast of Krajina or SAO Krajina was a self-proclaimed Serb Autonomous Region (oblast) within modern-day Croatia (then a part of Yugoslavia). The territory consisted of majority-Serbian municipalities of the Republic of Croatia that declared autonomy in October 1990. It was formed as the  SAO Kninska Krajina (САО Книнска Крајина), but, upon inclusion of additional Serb-populated areas, changed its name simply to SAO Krajina. In 1991 the SAO Krajina declared itself the Republic of Serbian Krajina, and subsequently included the other two Serbian SAOs in Croatia, the SAO Western Slavonia and the SAO Eastern Slavonia, Baranja and Western Syrmia.

History 

After the Croatian multi-party elections in 1990, ethnic tensions within Croatia increased. The Croatian President Franjo Tuđman was planning Croatian secession from Yugoslavia. So, in anticipation, Serb leaders created an autonomous region around the city of Knin. Initially, this was dubbed the SAO Kninska Krajina, but, after joining with the Association of Municipalities of Northern Dalmatia and Lika, it was renamed SAO Krajina in December 1990.

In December 1990, the SAO Kninska Krajina encompassed the Community of Municipalities of Northern Dalmatia and Lika. It merged with the Association of Autonomous Serb Municipalities and soon started making its own government institutions, including the Serbian National Council, a parliament for the region. Originally it was expected that Franjo Tuđman wanted Croatia to be a nation state within Yugoslavia after democratic and decentralizing reforms. When this turned out to be unlikely, they wanted it to be independent of Croatia but remain within the mini-Yugoslavia proposed under the Belgrade Initiative. On February 28, 1991 the SAO Krajina was officially declared. It announced that it planned to separate from Croatia if it moved for independence from Yugoslavia.

The Serb National Council on March 16, 1991 declared Krajina to be independent of Croatia. On May 12, 1991 a referendum was held with over 99 percent of the vote supporting unification with Serbia. On 1 April 1991, it declared that it would secede from Croatia. Afterwards the Krajina assembly declared that "the territory of the SAO Krajina is a constitutive part of the unified territory of the Republic of Serbia".

On 17 August 1990, an insurrection began in areas of the Republic of Croatia which were populated significantly by ethnic Serbs. The organizers were armed with illegal weapons supplied by Milan Martić. The revolt was explained by the Serbs with words that they are "terrorized [by Croatian government]" and that they "[fight for] more cultural, language and education rights". Serbian newspaper "Večernje Novosti" wrote that "2.000.000 Serbs [are] ready to go to Croatia to fight".

The Western diplomats commented that the Serbian media is inflaming passions and Croatian government said "We knew about the scenario to create confusion in Croatia...".

Conflict soon began between the Krajina Serbs and Croatian authorities. After Slovenia and Croatia declared independence, violence escalated as the Serbs expanded the territory they held with the help of the Yugoslav People's Army (JNA), eventually to include SAO Eastern Slavonia, Baranja and Western Syrmia and SAO Western Slavonia. The Serb-controlled territory included a third of Croatia at this point of the Croatian War of Independence.

On 19 December 1991, the two SAOs through the initiative of Milan Babić (president of SAO Krajina) and Goran Hadžić (president of SAO Eastern Slavonia, Baranja and Western Syrmia) were declared as one Serbian state with the name Republic of Serbian Krajina.

On December 21, 1990, the municipalities of Knin, Benkovac, Vojnić, Obrovac, Gračac, Dvor and Kostajnica adopted the "Statute of the Serbian Autonomous Region of Krajina". It merged with the Association of Autonomous Serb Municipalities and soon started making its own government institutions, including the Serbian National Council, a parliament for the region.

In February 1992, the authorities declared independence.

This self-proclaimed SAO Krajina was dissolved after August 5, 1995 when Croatian armed forces reintegrated its territories into Croatia.

See also 
Croatian War of Independence
Breakup of Yugoslavia
Republic of Serbian Krajina
Serbian Autonomous Oblasts
Kninska Krajina
SAO Western Slavonia
SAO Eastern Slavonia, Baranja and Western Syrmia
Socialist Republic of Croatia

References

External links 
Yugoslav Wars map

1990 establishments in Croatia
States and territories disestablished in 1991
States and territories established in 1990
Republic of Serbian Krajina
Separatism in Croatia
Serbian nationalism in Croatia